The 1977–78 season was Colchester United's 36th season in their history and first season back in third tier of English football, the Third Division following promotion the previous season. Alongside competing in the Third Division, the club also participated in the FA Cup and the League Cup.

Colchester made steady progress under Bobby Roberts ending the campaign in a strong eighth in the league table. They were eliminated in the League Cup by Leeds United in the third round, while they could not capitalise on last seasons FA Cup success, exiting the competition in the second round to Watford.

Season overview
A strong start to the season saw Colchester reach the top of the Third Division table following four wins in the first five games. A slump in form ended their promotion hopes following one win in ten games after January and the sale of Colin Garwood to Portsmouth for £25,000. They ended the season in eighth position, eight points behind promoted Preston North End.

In the cups, a League Cup run saw the U's thrash former manager Jim Smith's Second Division Blackburn Rovers 4–0 in a second round replay before facing old cup adversaries Leeds United in the third round. Colchester were humbled 4–0 at Elland Road. In the FA Cup, Bournemouth were seen off after two replays, but Colchester succumbed to Watford in the second round.

Players

Transfers

In

 Total spending:  ~ £20,000

Out

 Total incoming:  ~ £52,000

Loans out

Match details

Third Division

Results round by round

League table

Matches

League Cup

FA Cup

Squad statistics

Appearances and goals

|-
!colspan="14"|Players who appeared for Colchester who left during the season

|}

Goalscorers

Disciplinary record

Clean sheets
Number of games goalkeepers kept a clean sheet.

Player debuts
Players making their first-team Colchester United debut in a fully competitive match.

See also
List of Colchester United F.C. seasons

References

General
Books

Websites

Specific

1977-78
English football clubs 1977–78 season